North Carolina Aquariums is a system of three public aquariums located in Kure Beach, Roanoke Island and Pine Knoll Shores. All are operated by the Aquariums Division of the North Carolina Department of Natural and Cultural Resources since 1976 and were accredited by the Association of Zoos and Aquariums. All three aquariums feature dive shows, live animal encounters, and feeding programs.

North Carolina Aquarium at Fort Fisher
The focus of the North Carolina Aquarium at Fort Fisher, in Kure Beach, is to educate visitors about the waters of the Cape Fear region. The aquarium was recently named among the Best Aquariums in the United States by the Travel Channel and is one of the Top Ten Attractions in North Carolina. The Cape Fear Conservatory, the visitors' first stop in the aquarium, features freshwater life. In this large, tree-filled atrium, streams, ponds and swamps are home to frogs, snakes, bass, catfish, and perch. Box turtles hide among the Conservatory's groundcover. American alligators native to North Carolina occupy one of the larger exhibits in the Conservatory. An albino alligator exhibit opened in 2009. In 2006, the aquarium opened an exhibit featuring the venomous snakes of the region, including several species of rattlesnake, copperheads, and cottonmouths.

The Coastal Waters Gallery, which includes the Coquina Outcrop Touch Pool, provides hands-on opportunities to learn about sea urchins, horseshoe crabs, whelks, and other creatures of a rocky outcrop surf zone. Masonboro Inlet Jetty features the fishes common around a wave-washed rock jetty, an indoor salt marsh, a sea horse habitat, and a loggerhead sea turtle display.

The Open Oceans Gallery includes Sharkstooth Ledge, which features fish common to offshore North Carolina, such as pufferfish, hogfish, and filefish. The gallery also displays octopus, jellyfish, and corals native to the state's waters. A new multimedia suite features an extinct whale-eating shark called megalodon. This exhibit have been opened on July 1, 2011, and includes projections on a 23-ft curved screen, as well as interactive holograms and touch-screen interfaces.

Holding , Cape Fear Shoals is the largest of the aquarium's saltwater exhibits. The -deep replica of an offshore reef affords two-story, multi-level views of large sharks, stingrays, groupers, and moray eels.

The Exotic Aquatics Display features animals native to Indo-Pacific and other ocean regions. These displays include spiny lobsters, the red lionfish (Pterois volitans), and a North Carolina native, the spotted scorpionfish. They are both known for their inconspicuous, venomous spines. Lionfish are native to the Indian and Pacific Oceans, but in 2000 were confirmed as having established themselves in North Carolina. Australian spotted jellies, recently invasive in U.S. coastal waters, are among the gallery's newer exhibits. In June 2012, the aquarium opened the Bamboo Shark Touch Pool exhibit which allows visitors to touch live bamboo sharks. Bamboo sharks are considered harmless to humans and the aquarium hopes to educate visitors about sharks through interaction.

The  Pacific Reef Display features living corals, giant clam, anemones, cardinalfish, hawkfish, clownfish, wrasses, surgeonfish, and nearly a dozen other fish species.

Expansion
The facility closed in November 1999 for a major expansion and reopened in March 2002. The expansion included the creation of the Cape Fear Shoals tank, a  exhibit recreating the hard bottomed coral reefs off the coast of North Carolina.

North Carolina Aquarium at Pine Knoll Shores

Since reopening, the North Carolina Aquarium at Pine Knoll Shores has continued to feature aquatic animals of North Carolina. Notable among them are sand tiger sharks, a green moray eel measuring about six feet long, a goliath grouper approaching four feet, and a number of sizable nurse sharks, sandbar sharks and various game fishes.

Most of the larger creatures inhabit the aquarium's centerpiece exhibit, the  Living Shipwreck. Along with hundreds of schooling fishes and other animals, they create a swirl of constant motion around a replica of U-352, a German submarine that lost a World War II battle with a Coast Guard cutter off the North Carolina coast. The aquarium's three river otters also have lived up to expectations of stardom. With the help of the public, two were named Neuse and Pungo after North Carolina rivers. Neuse and Pungo came to the aquarium when they were about a year old in 2006. Eno, the third otter, was brought to the aquarium at four weeks old in April 2008, after his mother was killed by a car near White Lake. Aquarists bottle-fed him until he could trade formula for fish and other solid food, and helped him learn to swim. Now he's strong, healthy, energetic and playful. Wide viewing windows bring their playful antics and underwater agility to child-eye-level, and the lively pair enchants people of all ages.

The North Carolina Aquarium also features two hands-on exhibits: the Tidal Touch Pool, featuring a large variety of aquatic invertebrates, and Skate and Ray Encounters.

On August 11, 2010, a rare white sea turtle was brought to the aquarium for care. The turtle, Nimbus, was weak and smaller than the average loggerhead hatchling. It turned up when a hatched-out Pine Knoll Shores nest was excavated for baby turtles left behind. Hampered by a cleft palate, it had to be coaxed into eating. It lagged behind in growth, also, but appears to be catching up with other hatchlings of the same age. Nimbus is on exhibit in the Tidal Waters Gallery. The turtle is something of a rock star at the aquarium — especially with visiting school groups.

Throughout the year the North Carolina Aquarium offers free daily programs, including live animal programs, animal feeding presentations, a "Live Dive!" show, puppet shows, quiz games and hands-on activities. A number of special activities are available for a small fee. In the summer, beginning June 1, the North Carolina Aquarium offers snorkeling, surfing classes, night treks to search for nesting sea turtles, onboard collection and river cruises, kayaking and canoeing excursions, and fishing courses. Kayaking, canoeing and fishing programs continue into the fall when seafood cooking classes are also offered. Behind-the-scenes tours, Dinner with the Critters, and Breakfast with the Rays are offered year-round.

North Carolina Aquarium on Roanoke Island

The North Carolina Aquarium on Roanoke Island is a facility located on the Outer Banks.  It holds a replica of the USS Monitor, a Civil War ironclad which sank off the coast of Cape Hatteras in late December, 1862. On June 27, 2014.

Jennette's Pier
In 2002, the NC Aquarium Society purchased Jennette's Pier in Nags Head, the oldest pier along the Outer Banks, with plans to refurbish it as an outreach site. Those plans were put on hold in September 2003, when Hurricane Isabel destroyed the structure. Plans were made to completely rebuild Jennette's as a concrete structure with a  pier. $25 million was set aside for construction which began in early 2009. On May 21, 2011, Jennette's Pier was finally reopened to the public. Year-round education programs and week-long summer camps focused on ethical practices in recreational fishing, marine science, and resource conservation are conducted at the pier. Jennette's Pier is self-supporting and receives no state appropriations to operate. Three wind turbines on the pier when repaired and upgraded will provide a significant portion of the pier's electricity. The pier is also utilized as a platform for ocean-related scientific research projects.

In media 

"Oceans Under Glass," a segment of a 1995 episode of the PBS television series Return to the Sea, profiles the operations of the North Carolina Aquariums.

Notes

External links

 Carolina Aquarium Community Forum
Jennettes Pier

Return to the Sea Episode 301 "Oceans Under Glass," "Swimming With Whales," and "Whales Weep Not" at OceanArchives (Fair use policy for video at OceanArchives)
Return to the Sea Episode 301 segment "Oceans Under Glass" at OceanArchives (Fair use policy for video at OceanArchives)

Aquaria in North Carolina
Buildings and structures in Wilmington, North Carolina
Buildings and structures in Dare County, North Carolina
Buildings and structures in Carteret County, North Carolina
Tourist attractions in New Hanover County, North Carolina
Tourist attractions in Dare County, North Carolina
Tourist attractions in Carteret County, North Carolina
Historic Albemarle Tour
Roanoke Island